Kabbalah ( Qabbālā, literally "reception, tradition") is an esoteric method, discipline and school of thought in Jewish mysticism. A traditional Kabbalist is called a Mekubbal ( Məqūbbāl "receiver"). The definition of Kabbalah varies according to the tradition and aims of those following it, from its origin in medieval Judaism to its later adaptations in Western esotericism (Christian Kabbalah and Hermetic Qabalah). Jewish Kabbalah is a set of esoteric teachings meant to explain the relationship between the unchanging, eternal God—the mysterious Ein Sof ("The Infinite")—and the mortal, finite universe (God's creation). It forms the foundation of mystical religious interpretations within Judaism.

Jewish Kabbalists originally developed their own transmission of sacred texts within the realm of Jewish tradition and often use classical Jewish scriptures to explain and demonstrate its mystical teachings. These teachings are held by Kabbalists to define the inner meaning of both the Hebrew Bible and traditional rabbinic literature and their formerly concealed transmitted dimension, as well as to explain the significance of Jewish religious observances.

Traditional practitioners believe its earliest origins pre-date world religions, forming the primordial blueprint for Creation's philosophies, religions, sciences, arts, and political systems. Historically, Kabbalah emerged from earlier forms of Jewish mysticism, in 12th- to 13th-century Spain and Southern France, and was reinterpreted during the Jewish mystical renaissance in 16th-century Ottoman Palestine. The Zohar, the foundational text of Kabbalah, was composed in the late 13th century. Isaac Luria (16th century) is considered the father of contemporary Kabbalah; Lurianic Kabbalah was popularised in the form of Hasidic Judaism from the 18th century onwards. During the 20th century, academic interest in Kabbalistic texts led primarily by the Jewish historian Gershom Scholem has inspired the development of historical research on Kabbalah in the field of Judaic studies.

Traditions 

According to the Zohar, a foundational text for kabbalistic thought, Torah study can proceed along four levels of interpretation (exegesis). These four levels are called pardes from their initial letters (PRDS , orchard).
 Peshat ( lit. "simple"): the direct interpretations of meaning.
 Remez ( lit. "hint[s]"): the allegoric meanings (through allusion).
 Derash ( from Heb. darash: "inquire" or "seek"): midrashic (rabbinic) meanings, often with imaginative comparisons with similar words or verses.
 Sod ( lit. "secret" or "mystery"): the inner, esoteric (metaphysical) meanings, expressed in kabbalah.

Kabbalah is considered by its followers as a necessary part of the study of Torah – the study of Torah (the Tanakh and rabbinic literature) being an inherent duty of observant Jews.

Modern academic-historical study of Jewish mysticism reserves the term "kabbalah" to designate the particular, distinctive doctrines that textually emerged fully expressed in the Middle Ages, as distinct from the earlier Merkabah mystical concepts and methods. According to this descriptive categorization, both versions of Kabbalistic theory, the medieval-Zoharic and the early-modern Lurianic Kabbalah together comprise the Theosophical tradition in Kabbalah, while the Meditative-Ecstatic Kabbalah incorporates a parallel inter-related Medieval tradition. A third tradition, related but more shunned, involves the magical aims of Practical Kabbalah. Moshe Idel, for example, writes that these 3 basic models can be discerned operating and competing throughout the whole history of Jewish mysticism, beyond the particular Kabbalistic background of the Middle Ages. They can be readily distinguished by their basic intent with respect to God:
 The Theosophical or Theosophical-Theurgic tradition of Theoretical Kabbalah (the main focus of the Zohar and Luria) seeks to understand and describe the divine realm using the imaginative and mythic symbols of human psychological experience. As an intuitive conceptual alternative to rationalist Jewish philosophy, particularly Maimonides' Aristotelianism, this speculation became the central stream of Kabbalah, and the usual reference of the term "kabbalah". Its theosophy also implies the innate, centrally important theurgic influence of human conduct on redeeming or damaging the spiritual realms, as man is a divine microcosm, and the spiritual realms the divine macrocosm. The purpose of traditional theosophical kabbalah was to give the whole of normative Jewish religious practice this mystical metaphysical meaning
 The Meditative tradition of Ecstatic Kabbalah (exemplified by Abraham Abulafia and Isaac of Acre) strives to achieve a mystical union with God, or nullification of the meditator in God's Active intellect. Abraham Abulafia's "Prophetic Kabbalah" was the supreme example of this, though marginal in Kabbalistic development, and his alternative to the program of theosophical Kabbalah. Abulafian meditation built upon the philosophy of Maimonides, whose following remained the rationalist threat to theosophical kabbalists
 The Magico-Talismanic tradition of Practical Kabbalah (in often unpublished manuscripts) endeavours to alter both the Divine realms and the World using practical methods. While theosophical interpretations of worship see its redemptive role as harmonising heavenly forces, Practical Kabbalah properly involved white-magical acts, and was censored by kabbalists for only those completely pure of intent, as it relates to lower realms where purity and impurity are mixed. Consequently, it formed a separate minor tradition shunned from Kabbalah. Practical Kabbalah was prohibited by the Arizal until the Temple in Jerusalem is rebuilt and the required state of ritual purity is attainable.

According to Kabbalistic belief, early kabbalistic knowledge was transmitted orally by the Patriarchs, prophets, and sages, eventually to be "interwoven" into Jewish religious writings and culture. According to this view, early kabbalah was, in around the 10th century BCE, an open knowledge practiced by over a million people in ancient Israel. Foreign conquests drove the Jewish spiritual leadership of the time (the Sanhedrin) to hide the knowledge and make it secret, fearing that it might be misused if it fell into the wrong hands.

It is hard to clarify with any degree of certainty the exact concepts within kabbalah. There are several different schools of thought with very different outlooks; however, all are accepted as correct. Modern halakhic authorities have tried to narrow the scope and diversity within kabbalah, by restricting study to certain texts, notably Zohar and the teachings of Isaac Luria as passed down through Hayyim ben Joseph Vital. However, even this qualification does little to limit the scope of understanding and expression, as included in those works are commentaries on Abulafian writings, Sefer Yetzirah, Albotonian writings, and the Berit Menuhah, which is known to the kabbalistic elect and which, as described more recently by Gershom Scholem, combined ecstatic with theosophical mysticism. It is therefore important to bear in mind when discussing things such as the sephirot and their interactions that one is dealing with highly abstract concepts that at best can only be understood intuitively.

Jewish and non-Jewish Kabbalah

From the Renaissance onwards Jewish Kabbalah texts entered non-Jewish culture, where they were studied and translated by Christian Hebraists and Hermetic occultists. The syncretic traditions of Christian Cabala and Hermetic Qabalah developed independently of Judaic Kabbalah, reading the Jewish texts as universalist ancient wisdom preserved from the Gnostic traditions of antiquity. Both adapted the Jewish concepts freely from their Jewish understanding, to merge with multiple other theologies, religious traditions and magical associations. With the decline of Christian Cabala in the Age of Reason, Hermetic Qabalah continued as a central underground tradition in Western esotericism. Through these non-Jewish associations with magic, alchemy and divination, Kabbalah acquired some popular occult connotations forbidden within Judaism, where Jewish theurgic Practical Kabbalah was a minor, permitted tradition restricted for a few elite. Today, many publications on Kabbalah belong to the non-Jewish New Age and occult traditions of Cabala, rather than giving an accurate picture of Judaic Kabbalah. Instead, academic and traditional Jewish publications now translate and study Judaic Kabbalah for wide readership.

History of Jewish mysticism

Origins 
According to the traditional Kabbalistic understanding, Kabbalah dates from Eden. It came down from a remote past as a revelation to elect tzadikim (righteous people), and, for the most part, was preserved only by a privileged few. Talmudic Judaism records its view of the proper protocol for teaching secrets in the Talmud, Tractate Hagigah, 11b-13a, "One should not teach . . . the work of Creation in pairs, nor the work of the Chariot to an individual, unless he is wise and can understand the implications himself etc."

Contemporary scholarship suggests that various schools of Jewish esotericism arose at different periods of Jewish history, each reflecting not only prior forms of mysticism, but also the intellectual and cultural milieu of that historical period. Answers to questions of transmission, lineage, influence, and innovation vary greatly and cannot be easily summarised.

Terms 
Originally, Kabbalistic knowledge was believed to be an integral part of the Oral Torah, given by God to Moses on Mount Sinai around the 13th century BCE according to its followers; although some believe that Kabbalah began with Adam.

For a few centuries the esoteric knowledge was referred to by its aspect practice—meditation Hitbonenut, Rebbe Nachman of Breslov's Hitbodedut, translated as "being alone" or "isolating oneself", or by a different term describing the actual, desired goal of the practice—prophecy ("NeVu'a" ). Kabbalistic scholar Aryeh Kaplan traces the origins of medieval Kabbalistic meditative methods to their inheritance from orally transmitted remnants of the Biblical Prophetic tradition, and reconstructs their terminology and speculated techniques.

From the 5th century BCE, when the works of the Tanakh were edited and canonised and the secret knowledge encrypted within the various writings and scrolls ("Megilot"), esoteric knowledge became referred to as Ma'aseh Merkavah and Ma'aseh B'reshit, respectively "the act of the Chariot" and "the act of Creation". Merkabah mysticism alluded to the encrypted knowledge, and meditation methods within the book of the prophet Ezekiel describing his vision of the "Divine Chariot". B'reshit mysticism referred to the first chapter of Genesis in the Torah that is believed to contain secrets of the creation of the universe and forces of nature. These terms received their later historical documentation and description in the second chapter of the Talmudic tractate Hagigah from the early centuries CE.

Confidence in new Prophetic revelation closed after the Biblical return from Babylon in Second Temple Judaism, shifting to canonisation and exegesis of Scripture after Ezra the Scribe. Lesser level prophecy of Ruach Hakodesh remained, with angelic revelations, esoteric heavenly secrets, and eschatological deliverance from Greek and Roman oppression of Apocalyptic literature among early Jewish proto-mystical circles, such as the Book of Daniel and the Dead Sea Scrolls community of Qumran. Early Jewish mystical literature inherited the developing concerns and remnants of Prophetic and Apocalyptic Judaisms.

Mystic elements of the Torah 

When read by later generations of Kabbalists, the Torah's description of the creation in the Book of Genesis reveals mysteries about God himself, the true nature of Adam and Eve, the Garden of Eden, the Tree of Knowledge of Good and Evil, and the Tree of Life, as well as the interaction of these supernatural entities with the Serpent, which leads to disaster when they eat the forbidden fruit, as recorded in Genesis 3.

The Bible provides ample additional material for mythic and mystical speculation. The prophet Ezekiel's visions in particular attracted much mystical speculation, as did Isaiah's Temple vision. Other mystical events include Jacob's vision of the ladder to heaven, and Moses' encounters with the Burning bush and God on Mount Sinai.

The 72 letter name of God which is used in Jewish mysticism for meditation purposes is derived from the Hebrew verbal utterance Moses spoke in the presence of an angel, while the Sea of Reeds parted, allowing the Hebrews to escape their approaching attackers. The miracle of the Exodus, which led to Moses receiving the Ten Commandments and the Jewish Orthodox view of the acceptance of the Torah at Mount Sinai, preceded the creation of the first Jewish nation approximately three hundred years before King Saul.

Talmudic era 

In early Rabbinic Judaism (the early centuries of the 1st millennium CE), the terms Ma'aseh Bereshit ("Works of Creation") and Ma'aseh Merkabah ("Works of the Divine Throne/Chariot") clearly indicate the Midrashic nature of these speculations; they are really based upon Genesis 1 and Ezekiel 1:4–28, while the names Sitrei Torah (Hidden aspects of the Torah) (Talmud Hag. 13a) and Razei Torah (Torah secrets) (Ab. vi. 1) indicate their character as secret lore.

Talmudic doctrine forbade the public teaching of esoteric doctrines and warned of their dangers. In the Mishnah (Hagigah 2:1), rabbis were warned to teach the mystical creation doctrines only to one student at a time. To highlight the danger, in one Jewish aggadic ("legendary") anecdote, four prominent rabbis of the Mishnaic period (1st century CE) are said to have visited the Orchard (that is, Paradise, pardes, Hebrew:  lit., orchard):

In notable readings of this legend, only Rabbi Akiba was fit to handle the study of mystical doctrines. The Tosafot, medieval commentaries on the Talmud, say that the four sages "did not go up literally, but it appeared to them as if they went up". On the other hand, Louis Ginzberg, writes in the Jewish Encyclopedia (1901–1906) that the journey to paradise "is to be taken literally and not allegorically".

In contrast to the Kabbalists, Maimonides interprets pardes as philosophy and not mysticism.

Pre-Kabbalistic schools

Early mystical literature 
The mystical methods and doctrines of Hekhalot (Heavenly "Chambers") and Merkabah (Divine "Chariot") texts, named by modern scholars from these repeated motifs, lasted from the 1st century BCE through to the 10th century CE, before giving way to the documented manuscript emergence of Kabbalah. Initiates were said to "descend the chariot", possibly a reference to internal introspection on the Heavenly journey through the spiritual realms. The ultimate aim was to arrive before the transcendent awe, rather than nearness, of the Divine. The mystical protagonists of the texts are famous Talmudic Sages of Rabbinic Judaism, either pseudepigraphic or documenting remnants of a developed tradition. From the 8th to 11th centuries, the Hekhalot texts, and the proto-Kabbalistic early cosmogonic Sefer Yetzirah ("Book of Creation") made their way into European Jewish circles. A controversial esoteric work from associated literature describing a cosmic Anthropos, Shi'ur Qomah, was interpreted allegorically by subsequent Kabbalists in their meditation on the Sephirot Divine Persona.

Hasidei Ashkenaz 
Another, separate influential mystical, theosophical, and pious movement, shortly before the arrival there of Kabbalistic theory, was the "Hasidei Ashkenaz" (חסידי אשכנז) or Medieval German Pietists from 1150 to 1250. This ethical-ascetic movement with elite theoretical and Practical Kabbalah speculations arose mostly among a single scholarly family, the Kalonymus family of the French and German Rhineland. Its Jewish ethics of saintly self-sacrifice influenced Ashkenazi Jewry, Musar literature and later emphases of piety in Judaism.

Medieval emergence of the Kabbalah 

Modern scholars have identified several mystical brotherhoods that functioned in Europe starting in the 12th century. Some, such as the "Iyyun Circle" and the "Unique Cherub Circle", were truly esoteric, remaining largely anonymous. The first documented historical emergence of Theosophical Kabbalistic doctrine occurred among Jewish Sages of Provence and Languedoc in southern France in the latter 1100s, with the appearance or consolidation of the mysterious work the Bahir (Book of "Brightness"), a midrash describing God's sephirot attributes as a dynamic interacting hypostatic drama in the Divine realm, and the school of Isaac the Blind (1160–1235) among critics of the rationalist influence of Maimonides. From there Kabbalah spread to Catalonia in north-east Spain around the central Rabbinic figure of Nahmanides (the Ramban) (1194–1270) in the early 1200s, with a Neoplatonic orientation focused on the upper sephirot. Subsequently, Kabbalistic doctrine reached its fullest classic expression among Castilian Kabbalists from the latter 1200s, with the Zohar (Book of "Splendor") literature, concerned with cosmic healing of gnostic dualities between the lower, revealed male and female attributes of God.

Rishonim ("Elder Sages") of exoteric Judaism who were deeply involved in Kabbalistic activity, gave the Kabbalah wide scholarly acceptance, including Nahmanides and Bahya ben Asher (Rabbeinu Behaye) (died 1340), whose classic commentaries on the Torah reference Kabbalistic esotericism.

Many Orthodox Jews reject the idea that Kabbalah underwent significant historical development or change such as has been proposed above. After the composition known as the Zohar was presented to the public in the 13th century, the term "Kabbalah" began to refer more specifically to teachings derived from, or related to, the Zohar. At an even later time, the term began to generally be applied to Zoharic teachings as elaborated upon by Isaac Luria (the Arizal). Historians generally date the start of Kabbalah as a major influence in Jewish thought and practice with the publication of the Zohar and climaxing with the spread of the Lurianic teachings. The majority of Haredi Jews accept the Zohar as the representative of the Ma'aseh Merkavah and Ma'aseh B'reshit that are referred to in Talmudic texts.

Ecstatic Kabbalah 
Contemporary with the Zoharic efflorescence of Spanish Theosophical-Theurgic Kabbalah, Spanish exilarch Abraham Abulafia developed his own alternative, Maimonidean system of Ecstatic-Prophetic Kabbalah meditation, each consolidating aspects of a claimed inherited mystical tradition from Biblical times. This was the classic time when various different interpretations of an esoteric meaning to Torah were articulated among Jewish thinkers. Abulafia interpreted Theosophical Kabbalah's Sephirot Divine attributes, not as supernal hypostases which he opposed, but in psychological terms. Instead of influencing harmony in the divine real by theurgy, his meditative scheme aimed for mystical union with God, drawing down prophetic influx on the individual. He saw this meditation using Divine Names as a superior form of Kabbalistic ancient tradition. His version of Kabbalah, followed in the medieval eastern Mediterranean, remained a marginal stream to mainstream Theosophical Kabbalah development. Abulafian elements were later incorporated into the 16th century theosophical Kabbalistic systemisations of Moses Cordovero and Hayim Vital. Through them, later Hasidic Judaism incorporated elements of unio mystica and psychological focus from Abulafia.

Early modern era

Lurianic Kabbalah 

Following the upheavals and dislocations in the Jewish world as a result of anti-Judaism during the Middle Ages, and the national trauma of the expulsion from Spain in 1492, closing the Spanish Jewish flowering, Jews began to search for signs of when the long-awaited Jewish Messiah would come to comfort them in their painful exiles. In the 16th century, the community of Safed in the Galilee became the centre of Jewish mystical, exegetical, legal and liturgical developments. The Safed mystics responded to the Spanish expulsion by turning Kabbalistic doctrine and practice towards a messianic focus. Moses Cordovero (The RAMAK 1522–1570) and his school popularized the teachings of the Zohar which had until then been only a restricted work. Cordovero's comprehensive works achieved the first (quasi-rationalistic) of Theosophical Kabbalah's two systemisations, harmonising preceding interpretations of the Zohar on its own apparent terms. The author of the Shulkhan Arukh (the normative Jewish "Code of Law"), Yosef Karo (1488–1575), was also a scholar of Kabbalah who kept a personal mystical diary. Moshe Alshich wrote a mystical commentary on the Torah, and Shlomo Alkabetz wrote Kabbalistic commentaries and poems.

The messianism of the Safed mystics culminated in Kabbalah receiving its biggest transformation in the Jewish world with the explication of its new interpretation from Isaac Luria (The ARI 1534–1572), by his disciples Hayim Vital and Israel Sarug. Both transcribed Luria's teachings (in variant forms) gaining them widespread popularity, Sarug taking Lurianic Kabbalah to Europe, Vital authoring the latterly canonical version. Luria's teachings came to rival the influence of the Zohar and Luria stands, alongside Moses de Leon, as the most influential mystic in Jewish history. Lurianic Kabbalah gave Theosophical Kabbalah its second, complete (supra-rational) of two systemisations, reading the Zohar in light of its most esoteric sections (the Idrot), replacing the broken Sephirot attributes of God with rectified Partzufim (Divine Personas), embracing reincarnation, repair, and the urgency of cosmic Jewish messianism dependent on each person's soul tasks.

Influence on non-Jewish society 
From the European Renaissance on, Judaic Kabbalah became a significant influence in non-Jewish culture, fully divorced from the separately evolving Judaic tradition. Kabbalah received the interest of Christian Hebraist scholars and occultists, who freely syncretised and adapted it to diverse non-Jewish spiritual traditions and belief systems of Western esotericism. Christian Cabalists from the 15th-18th centuries adapted what they saw as ancient Biblical wisdom to Christian theology, while Hermeticism lead to Kabbalah's incorporation into Western magic through Hermetic Qabalah. Presentations of Kabbalah in occult and New Age books on Kabbalah bear little resemblance to Judaic Kabbalah.

Ban on studying Kabbalah 
The Rabbinic ban on studying Kabbalah in Jewish society was lifted by the efforts of the 16th-century kabbalist Avraham Azulai (1570–1643).

The question, however, is whether the ban ever existed in the first place. Concerning the above quote by Avraham Azulai, it has found many versions in English, another is this

The lines concerning the year 1490 are also missing from the Hebrew edition of Hesed L'Avraham, the source work that both of these quote from. Furthermore, by Azulai's view the ban was lifted thirty years before his birth, a time that would have corresponded with Haim Vital's publication of the teaching of Isaac Luria. Moshe Isserles understood there to be only a minor restriction, in his words, "One's belly must be full of meat and wine, discerning between the prohibited and the permitted." He is supported by the Bier Hetiv, the Pithei Teshuva as well as the Vilna Gaon. The Vilna Gaon says, "There was never any ban or enactment restricting the study of the wisdom of Kabbalah. Any who says there is has never studied Kabbalah, has never seen PaRDeS, and speaks as an ignoramus."

Sefardi and Mizrahi 

The Kabbalah of the Sefardi (Iberian Peninsula) and Mizrahi (Middle East, North Africa, and the Caucasus) Torah scholars has a long history. Kabbalah in various forms was widely studied, commented upon, and expanded by North African, Turkish, Yemenite, and Asian scholars from the 16th century onward. It flourished among Sefardic Jews in Tzfat (Safed), even before the arrival of Isaac Luria. Yosef Karo, author of the Shulchan Arukh was part of the Tzfat school of Kabbalah. Shlomo Alkabetz, author of the hymn Lekhah Dodi, taught there.

His disciple Moses ben Jacob Cordovero (or Cordoeiro) authored Pardes Rimonim, an organised, exhaustive compilation of kabbalistic teachings on a variety of subjects up to that point. Cordovero headed the academy of Tzfat until his death, when Isaac Luria rose to prominence. Rabbi Moshe's disciple Eliyahu De Vidas authored the classic work, Reishit Chochma, combining kabbalistic and mussar (moral) teachings. Chaim Vital also studied under Cordovero, but with the arrival of Luria became his main disciple. Vital claimed to be the only one authorised to transmit the Ari's teachings, though other disciples also published books presenting Luria's teachings.

The Oriental Kabbalist tradition continues until today among Sephardi and Mizrachi Hakham sages and study circles. Among leading figures were the Yemenite Shalom Sharabi (1720–1777) of the Beit El Synagogue, the Jerusalemite Hida (1724–1806), the Baghdad leader Ben Ish Chai (1832–1909), and the Abuhatzeira dynasty.

Maharal 

One of the most innovative theologians in early-modern Judaism was Judah Loew ben Bezalel (1525–1609) known as the "Maharal of Prague". Many of his written works survive and are studied for their unusual combination of the mystical and philosophical approaches in Judaism. While conversant in Kabbalistic learning, he expresses Jewish mystical thought in his own individual approach without reference to Kabbalistic terms. The Maharal is most well known in popular culture for the legend of the golem of Prague, associated with him in folklore. However, his thought influenced Hasidism, for example being studied in the introspective Przysucha school. During the 20th century, Isaac Hutner (1906–1980) continued to spread the Maharal's works indirectly through his own teachings and publications within the non-Hasidic yeshiva world.

Sabbatian antinomian movements 
The spiritual and mystical yearnings of many Jews remained frustrated after the death of Isaac Luria and his disciples and colleagues. No hope was in sight for many following the devastation and mass killings of the pogroms that followed in the wake of the Chmielnicki Uprising (1648–1654), the largest single massacre of Jews until the Holocaust, and it was at this time that a controversial scholar by the name of Sabbatai Zevi (1626–1676) captured the hearts and minds of the Jewish masses of that time with the promise of a newly minted messianic Millennialism in the form of his own personage.

His charisma, mystical teachings that included repeated pronunciations of the holy Tetragrammaton in public, tied to an unstable personality, and with the help of his greatest enthusiast, Nathan of Gaza, convinced the Jewish masses that the Jewish Messiah had finally come. It seemed that the esoteric teachings of Kabbalah had found their "champion" and had triumphed, but this era of Jewish history unravelled when Zevi became an apostate to Judaism by converting to Islam after he was arrested by the Ottoman Sultan and threatened with execution for attempting a plan to conquer the world and rebuild the Temple in Jerusalem. Unwilling to give up their messianic expectations, a minority of Zevi's Jewish followers converted to Islam along with him.

Many of his followers, known as Sabbatians, continued to worship him in secret, explaining his conversion not as an effort to save his life but to recover the sparks of the holy in each religion, and most leading rabbis were always on guard to root them out. The Dönmeh movement in modern Turkey is a surviving remnant of the Sabbatian schism. Theologies developed by leaders of Sabbatian movements dealt with antinomian redemption of the realm of impurity through sin, based on Lurianic theory. Moderate views reserved this dangerous task for the divine messiah Sabbatai Zevi alone, while his followers remained observant Jews. Radical forms spoke of the messianic transcendence of Torah, and required Sabbatean followers to emulate him, either in private or publicly.

Due to the chaos caused in the Jewish world, the rabbinic prohibition against studying Kabbalah established itself firmly within the Jewish religion. One of the conditions allowing a man to study and engage himself in the Kabbalah was to be at least forty years old. This age requirement came about during this period and is not Talmudic in origin but rabbinic. Many Jews are familiar with this ruling, but are not aware of its origins. Moreover, the prohibition is not halakhic in nature. According to Moses Cordovero, halakhically, one must be of age twenty to engage in the Kabbalah. Many famous kabbalists, including the ARI, Rabbi Nachman of Breslov, Yehuda Ashlag, were younger than twenty when they began.

The Sabbatian movement was followed by that of the Frankists, disciples of Jacob Frank (1726–1791), who eventually became an apostate to Judaism by apparently converting to Catholicism. Frank took the Sabbatean impulse to its nihilistic end, declaring himself part of a messianic trinity along with his daughter, and that breaking all of Torah was its fulfilment. This era of disappointment did not stem the Jewish masses' yearnings for "mystical" leadership.

Modern era

Traditional Kabbalah 

Moshe Chaim Luzzatto (1707–1746), based in Italy, was a precocious Talmudic scholar who deduced a need for the public teaching and study of Kabbalah. He established a yeshiva for Kabbalah study and actively recruited students. He wrote copious manuscripts in an appealing clear Hebrew style, all of which gained the attention of both admirers and rabbinical critics, who feared another "Sabbatai Zevi" (false messiah) in the making. His rabbinical opponents forced him to close his school, hand over and destroy many of his most precious unpublished kabbalistic writings, and go into exile in the Netherlands. He eventually moved to the Land of Israel. Some of his most important works, such as Derekh Hashem, survive and serve as a gateway to the world of Jewish mysticism.

Elijah of Vilna (Vilna Gaon) (1720–1797), based in Lithuania, had his teachings encoded and publicised by his disciples, such as Chaim Volozhin's posthumously published the mystical-ethical work Nefesh HaChaim. He staunchly opposed the new Hasidic movement and warned against their public displays of religious fervour inspired by the mystical teachings of their rabbis. Although the Vilna Gaon did not look with favor on the Hasidic movement, he did not prohibit the study and engagement in the Kabbalah. This is evident from his writings in the Even Shlema. "He that is able to understand secrets of the Torah and does not try to understand them will be judged harshly, may God have mercy". (The Vilna Gaon, Even Shlema, 8:24). "The Redemption will only come about through learning Torah, and the essence of the Redemption depends upon learning Kabbalah" (The Vilna Gaon, Even Shlema, 11:3).

In the Oriental tradition of Kabbalah, Shalom Sharabi (1720–1777) from Yemen was a major esoteric clarifier of the works of the Ari. The Beit El Synagogue, "yeshivah of the kabbalists", which he came to head, was one of the few communities to bring Lurianic meditation into communal prayer.

In the 20th century, Yehuda Ashlag (1885—1954) in Mandate Palestine became a leading esoteric kabbalist in the traditional mode, who translated the Zohar into Hebrew with a new approach in Lurianic Kabbalah.

Hasidic Judaism 

Yisrael ben Eliezer Baal Shem Tov (1698–1760), founder of Hasidism in the area of the Ukraine, spread teachings based on Lurianic Kabbalah, but adapted to a different aim of immediate psychological perception of Divine Omnipresence amidst the mundane. The emotional, ecstatic fervour of early Hasidism developed from previous Nistarim circles of mystical activity, but instead sought communal revival of the common folk by reframing Judaism around the central principle of devekut (mystical cleaving to God) for all. This new approach turned formerly esoteric elite kabbalistic theory into a popular social mysticism movement for the first time, with its own doctrines, classic texts, teachings and customs. From the Baal Shem Tov sprang the wide ongoing schools of Hasidic Judaism, each with different approaches and thought. Hasidism instituted a new concept of Tzadik leadership in Jewish mysticism, where the elite scholars of mystical texts now took on a social role as embodiments and intercessors of Divinity for the masses. With the 19th-century consolidation of the movement, leadership became dynastic.

Among later Hasidic schools Rebbe Nachman of Breslov (1772–1810), the great-grandson of the Baal Shem Tov, revitalised and further expanded the latter's teachings, amassing a following of thousands in Ukraine, Belarus, Lithuania and Poland. In a unique amalgam of Hasidic and Mitnaged approaches, Rebbe Nachman emphasised study of both Kabbalah and serious Torah scholarship to his disciples. His teachings also differed from the way other Hasidic groups were developing, as he rejected the idea of hereditary Hasidic dynasties and taught that each Hasid must "search for the tzaddik ('saintly/righteous person')" for himself and within himself.

The Habad-Lubavitch intellectual school of Hasidism broke away from General-Hasidism's emotional faith orientation, by making the mind central as the route to the internal heart. Its texts combine what they view as rational investigation with explanation of Kabbalah through articulating unity in a common Divine essence. In recent times, the messianic element latent in Hasidism has come to the fore in Habad.

Haskalah opposition to mysticism 
The Jewish Haskalah enlightenment movement from the late 1700s renewed an ideology of rationalism in Judaism, giving birth to critical Judaic scholarship. It presented Judaism in apologetic terms, stripped of mysticism and myth, in line with Jewish emancipation. Many foundational historians of Judaism such as Heinrich Graetz, criticised Kabbalah as a foreign import that compromised historical Judaism. In the 20th century Gershom Scholem overturned Jewish historiography, presenting the centrality of Jewish mysticism and Kabbalah to historical Judaism, and their subterranean life as the true creative renewing spirit of Jewish thought and culture. His influence contributed to the flourishing of Jewish mysticism academia today, its impact on wider intellectual currents, and the contribution of mystical spirituality in modernist Jewish denominations today. Traditionalist Kabbalah and Hasidism, meanwhile, continued outside the academic interest in it.

20th-century influence 

Jewish mysticism has influenced the thought of some major Jewish theologians, philosophers, writers and thinkers in the 20th century, outside of Kabbalistic or Hasidic traditions. The first Chief Rabbi of Mandate Palestine, Abraham Isaac Kook was a mystical thinker who drew heavily on Kabbalistic notions through his own poetic terminology. His writings are concerned with fusing the false divisions between sacred and secular, rational and mystical, legal and imaginative. Students of Joseph B. Soloveitchik, figurehead of American Modern Orthodox Judaism have read the influence of Kabbalistic symbols in his philosophical works. Neo-Hasidism, rather than Kabbalah, shaped Martin Buber's philosophy of dialogue and Abraham Joshua Heschel's Conservative Judaism. Lurianic symbols of Tzimtzum and Shevirah have informed Holocaust theologians. Gershom Scholem's central academic influence on reshaping Jewish historiography in favour of myth and imagination, made historical arcane Kabbalah of relevance to wide intellectual discourse in the 20th century. Moshe Idel traces the influences of Kabbalistic and Hasidic concepts on diverse thinkers such as Walter Benjamin, Jacques Derrida, Franz Kafka, Franz Rosenzweig, Arnaldo Momigliano, Paul Celan and George Steiner. Harold Bloom has seen Kabbalistic hermeneutics as the paradigm for western literary criticism. Sanford Drob discusses the direct and indirect influence of Kabbalah on the depth psychologies of Sigmund Freud and Carl Jung, as well as modern and postmodern philosophers, in his project to develop new intellectual relevance and open dialogue for kabbalah. The interaction of Kabbalah with modern physics, as with other mystical traditions, has generated its own literature. Traditional Kabbalist Yitzchak Ginsburgh brings esoteric dimensions of advanced kabbalistic symmetry into relationship with mathematics and the sciences, including renaming the elementary particles of Quantum theory with Kabbalistic Hebrew names, and developing kabbalistic approaches to debates in Evolutionary theory.

Concepts

Concealed and revealed God 

The nature of the divine prompted kabbalists to envision two aspects to God: (a) God in essence, absolutely transcendent, unknowable, limitless divine simplicity beyond revelation, and (b) God in manifestation, the revealed persona of God through which he creates and sustains and relates to humankind. Kabbalists speak of the first as Ein/Ayn Sof (אין סוף "the infinite/endless", literally "there is no end"). Of the impersonal Ein Sof nothing can be grasped. However, the second aspect of divine emanations, are accessible to human perception, dynamically interacting throughout spiritual and physical existence, reveal the divine immanently, and are bound up in the life of man. Kabbalists believe that these two aspects are not contradictory but complement one another, emanations mystically revealing the concealed mystery from within the Godhead.

As a term describing the Infinite Godhead beyond Creation, Kabbalists viewed the Ein Sof itself as too sublime to be referred to directly in the Torah. It is not a Holy Name in Judaism, as no name could contain a revelation of the Ein Sof. Even terming it "No End" is an inadequate representation of its true nature, the description only bearing its designation in relation to Creation. However, the Torah does narrate God speaking in the first person, most memorably the first word of the Ten Commandments, a reference without any description or name to the simple Divine essence (termed also Atzmus Ein Sof – Essence of the Infinite) beyond even the duality of Infinitude/Finitude. In contrast, the term Ein Sof describes the Godhead as Infinite lifeforce first cause, continuously keeping all Creation in existence. The Zohar reads the first words of Genesis, BeReishit Bara Elohim – In the beginning God created, as "With (the level of) Reishit (Beginning) (the Ein Sof) created Elohim (God's manifestation in creation)":

The structure of emanations has been described in various ways: Sephirot (divine attributes) and Partzufim (divine "faces"), Ohr (spiritual light and flow), Names of God and the supernal Torah, Olamot (Spiritual Worlds), a Divine Tree and Archetypal Man, Angelic Chariot and Palaces, male and female, enclothed layers of reality, inwardly holy vitality and external Kelipot shells, 613 channels ("limbs" of the King) and the divine Souls of Man. These symbols are used to describe various levels and aspects of Divine manifestation, from the Pnimi (inner) dimensions to the Hitzoni (outer). It is solely in relation to the emanations, certainly not the Ein Sof Ground of all Being, that Kabbalah uses anthropomorphic symbolism to relate psychologically to divinity. Kabbalists debated the validity of anthropomorphic symbolism, between its disclosure as mystical allusion, versus its instrumental use as allegorical metaphor; in the language of the Zohar, symbolism "touches yet does not touch" its point.

Sephirot 

The Sephirot (also spelled "sefirot"; singular sefirah) are the ten emanations and attributes of God with which he continually sustains the existence of the universe. The Zohar and other Kabbalistic texts elaborate on the emergence of the sephirot from a state of concealed potential in the Ein Sof until their manifestation in the mundane world. In particular, Moses ben Jacob Cordovero (known as "the Ramak"), describes how God emanated the myriad details of finite reality out of the absolute unity of Divine light via the ten sephirot, or vessels.

Comparison of the Ramak's counting with Luria's, describes dual rational and unconscious aspects of Kabbalah. Two metaphors are used to describe the sephirot, their theocentric manifestation as the Trees of Life and Knowledge, and their anthropocentric correspondence in man, exemplified as Adam Kadmon. This dual-directional perspective embodies the cyclical, inclusive nature of the divine flow, where alternative divine and human perspectives have validity. The central metaphor of man allows human understanding of the sephirot, as they correspond to the psychological faculties of the soul, and incorporate masculine and feminine aspects after Genesis 1:27 ("God created man in His own image, in the image of God He created him, male and female He created them"). Corresponding to the last sefirah in Creation is the indwelling shekhinah (Feminine Divine Presence). Downward flow of divine Light in Creation forms the supernal Four Worlds; Atziluth, Beri'ah, Yetzirah and Assiah manifesting the dominance of successive sephirot towards action in this world. The acts of man unite or divide the Heavenly masculine and feminine aspects of the sephirot, their anthropomorphic harmony completing Creation. As the spiritual foundation of Creation, the sephirot correspond to the names of God in Judaism and the particular nature of any entity.

Ten Sephirot as process of Creation 
According to Lurianic cosmology, the sephirot correspond to various levels of creation (ten sephirot in each of the Four Worlds, and four worlds within each of the larger four worlds, each containing ten sephirot, which themselves contain ten sephirot, to an infinite number of possibilities), and are emanated from the Creator for the purpose of creating the universe. The sephirot are considered revelations of the Creator's will (ratzon), and they should not be understood as ten different "gods" but as ten different ways the one God reveals his will through the Emanations. It is not God who changes but the ability to perceive God that changes.

Ten Sephirot as process of ethics 

Divine creation by means of the Ten Sephirot is an ethical process. They represent the different aspects of Morality. Loving-Kindness is a possible moral justification found in Chessed, and Gevurah is the Moral Justification of Justice and both are mediated by Mercy which is Rachamim. However, these pillars of morality become immoral once they become extremes. When Loving-Kindness becomes extreme it can lead to sexual depravity and lack of Justice to the wicked. When Justice becomes extreme, it can lead to torture and the Murder of innocents and unfair punishment.

"Righteous" humans (tzadikim plural of Tzadik) ascend these ethical qualities of the ten sephirot by doing righteous actions. If there were no righteous humans, the blessings of God would become completely hidden, and creation would cease to exist. While real human actions are the "Foundation" (Yesod) of this universe (Malchut), these actions must accompany the conscious intention of compassion. Compassionate actions are often impossible without faith (Emunah), meaning to trust that God always supports compassionate actions even when God seems hidden. Ultimately, it is necessary to show compassion toward oneself too in order to share compassion toward others. This "selfish" enjoyment of God's blessings but only in order to empower oneself to assist others is an important aspect of "Restriction", and is considered a kind of golden mean in kabbalah, corresponding to the sefirah of Adornment (Tiferet) being part of the "Middle Column".

Moses ben Jacob Cordovero, wrote Tomer Devorah (Palm Tree of Deborah), in which he presents an ethical teaching of Judaism in the kabbalistic context of the ten sephirot. Tomer Devorah has become also a foundational Musar text.

Divine Feminine 

Both Rationalist Jewish philosophy and Kabbalah developed among the elite thinkers of medieval Spanish Jewry, but the austere intellectual sublimation of Judaism by the philosophers remained, by their own admission, accessible and appealing to restricted intellectually questioning circles. In contrast, while intuitive kabbalistic creativity was confined to esoteric circles, kabbalah deliberately appealed to wide reaches of the Jewish people in their popular piety, as its profoundly psychological depth theory incorporated the mythic, imaginative, sexual, and demonic in human experience.

Kabbalah describes Man as the inner dimension of all Spiritual and Physical Realms (with angels the outer aspect), from the verses "Let us make man in our image, after our likeness... And God created man in His own image, in the image of God He created him; male and female He created them... Then the LORD God formed man of the dust of the ground, and breathed into his nostrils the breath of life; and man became a living soul." (Genesis 1:26-27, 2:7). Kabbalists equated the final Sephirah Malkuth (Kingdom) with the indwelling Feminine Divine immanent Presence of God throughout Creation, adapting for it the previous Rabbinic term Shekhinah (Divine Presence), but lending the concept new hypostatic and sexual interpretation (Earlier Biblical Wisdom literature describes Wisdom as a feminine manifestation of God). The fallen, exiled state of Creation by man exiles the Shekhinah into captivity among the Kelipot forces of impurity, awaiting redemption Above by man Below. Nachman of Breslov saw this archetype in fairy tales of the world, but in disordered narrative. His Kabbalistic tales rearrange the symbols to free the Divine Queen for reunion with The Holy One Blessed Be He.

Partzufim 

The most esoteric Idrot sections of the classic Zohar make reference to hypostatic male and female Partzufim (Divine Personas) displacing the Sephirot, manifestations of God in particular Anthropomorphic symbolic personalities based on Biblical esoteric exegesis and midrashic narratives. Lurianic Kabbalah places these at the centre of our existence, rather than earlier Kabbalah's Sephirot, which Luria saw as broken in Divine crisis. Contemporary cognitive understanding of the Partzuf symbols relates them to Jungian archetypes of the collective unconscious, reflecting a psychologised progression from youth to sage in therapeutic healing back to the infinite Ein Sof/Unconscious, as Kabbalah is simultaneously both theology and psychology.

Descending spiritual worlds 

Medieval Kabbalists believed that all things are linked to God through these emanations, making all levels in creation part of one great, gradually descending chain of being. Through this any lower creation reflects its particular roots in supernal divinity. Kabbalists agreed with the divine transcendence described by Jewish philosophy, but as only referring to the Ein Sof unknowable Godhead. They reinterpreted the theistic philosophical concept of creation from nothing, replacing God's creative act with panentheistic continual self-emanation by the mystical Ayin Nothingness/No-thing sustaining all spiritual and physical realms as successively more corporeal garments, veils and condensations of divine immanence. The innumerable levels of descent divide into Four comprehensive spiritual worlds, Atziluth ("Closeness" – Divine Wisdom), Beriah ("Creation" – Divine Understanding), Yetzirah ("Formation" – Divine Emotions), Assiah ("Action" – Divine Activity), with a preceding Fifth World Adam Kadmon ("Primordial Man" – Divine Will) sometimes excluded due to its sublimity. Together the whole spiritual heavens form the Divine Persona/Anthropos.

Hasidic thought extends the divine immanence of Kabbalah by holding that God is all that really exists, all else being completely undifferentiated from God's perspective. This view can be defined as acosmic monistic panentheism. According to this philosophy, God's existence is higher than anything that this world can express, yet he includes all things of this world within his divine reality in perfect unity, so that the creation effected no change in him at all. This paradox as seen from dual human and divine perspectives is dealt with at length in Chabad texts.

Origin of evil 

Among problems considered in the Hebrew Kabbalah is the theological issue of the nature and origin of evil. In the views of some Kabbalists this conceives "evil" as a "quality of God", asserting that negativity enters into the essence of the Absolute. In this view it is conceived that the Absolute needs evil to "be what it is", i.e., to exist. Foundational texts of Medieval Kabbalism conceived evil as a demonic parallel to the holy, called the Sitra Achra (the "Other Side"), and the Kelipot/Qliphoth (the "Shells/Husks") that cover and conceal the holy, are nurtured from it, and yet also protect it by limiting its revelation. Scholem termed this element of the Spanish Kabbalah a "Jewish gnostic" motif, in the sense of dual powers in the divine realm of manifestation. In a radical notion, the root of evil is found within the 10 holy Sephirot, through an imbalance of Gevurah, the power of "Strength/Judgement/Severity".

Gevurah is necessary for Creation to exist as it counterposes Chesed ("loving-kindness"), restricting the unlimited divine bounty within suitable vessels, so forming the Worlds. However, if man sins (actualising impure judgement within his soul), the supernal Judgement is reciprocally empowered over the Kindness, introducing disharmony among the Sephirot in the divine realm and exile from God throughout Creation. The demonic realm, though illusory in its holy origin, becomes the real apparent realm of impurity in lower Creation. In the Zohar, the sin of Adam and Eve (who embodied Adam Kadmon below) took place in the spiritual realms. Their sin was that they separated the Tree of knowledge (10 sefirot within Malkuth, representing Divine immanence), from the Tree of life within it (10 sefirot within Tiferet, representing Divine transcendence). This introduced the false perception of duality into lower creation, an external Tree of Death nurtured from holiness, and an Adam Belial of impurity. In Lurianic Kabbalah, evil originates from a primordial shattering of the sephirot of God's Persona before creation of the stable spiritual worlds, mystically represented by the 8 Kings of Edom (the derivative of Gevurah) "who died" before any king reigned in Israel from Genesis 36. In the divine view from above within Kabbalah, emphasised in Hasidic Panentheism, the appearance of duality and pluralism below dissolves into the absolute Monism of God, psychologising evil. Though impure below, what appears as evil derives from a divine blessing too high to be contained openly. The mystical task of the righteous in the Zohar is to reveal this concealed Divine Oneness and absolute good, to "convert bitterness into sweetness, darkness into light".

Role of Man 

Kabbalistic doctrine gives man the central role in Creation, as his soul and body correspond to the supernal divine manifestations. In the Christian Kabbalah this scheme was universalised to describe harmonia mundi, the harmony of Creation within man. In Judaism, it gave a profound spiritualisation of Jewish practice. While the kabbalistic scheme gave a radically innovative, though conceptually continuous, development of mainstream Midrashic and Talmudic rabbinic notions, kabbalistic thought underscored and invigorated conservative Jewish observance. The esoteric teachings of kabbalah gave the traditional mitzvot observances the central role in spiritual creation, whether the practitioner was learned in this knowledge or not. Accompanying normative Jewish observance and worship with elite mystical kavanot intentions gave them theurgic power, but sincere observance by common folk, especially in the Hasidic popularisation of kabbalah, could replace esoteric abilities. Many kabbalists were also leading legal figures in Judaism, such as Nachmanides and Joseph Karo.

Medieval kabbalah elaborates particular reasons for each Biblical mitzvah, and their role in harmonising the supernal divine flow, uniting masculine and feminine forces on High. With this, the feminine Divine presence in this world is drawn from exile to the Holy One Above. The 613 mitzvot are embodied in the organs and soul of man. Lurianic Kabbalah incorporates this in the more inclusive scheme of Jewish messianic rectification of exiled divinity. Jewish mysticism, in contrast to Divine transcendence rationalist human-centred reasons for Jewish observance, gave Divine-immanent providential cosmic significance to the daily events in the worldly life of man in general, and the spiritual role of Jewish observance in particular.

Levels of the soul 

The Kabbalah posits that the human soul has three elements, the nefesh, ru'ach, and neshamah. The nefesh is found in all humans, and enters the physical body at birth. It is the source of one's physical and psychological nature. The next two parts of the soul are not implanted at birth, but can be developed over time; their development depends on the actions and beliefs of the individual. They are said to only fully exist in people awakened spiritually. A common way of explaining the three parts of the soul is as follows:
 Nefesh (נֶפֶשׁ): the lower part, or "animal part", of the soul. It is linked to instincts and bodily cravings. This part of the soul is provided at birth. 
 Ruach (רוּחַ): the middle soul, the "spirit". It contains the moral virtues and the ability to distinguish between good and evil. 
 Neshamah (נְשָׁמָה): the higher soul, or "super-soul". This separates man from all other life-forms. It is related to the intellect and allows man to enjoy and benefit from the afterlife. It allows one to have some awareness of the existence and presence of God.

The Raaya Meheimna, a section of related teachings spread throughout the Zohar, discusses fourth and fifth parts of the human soul, the chayyah and yehidah (first mentioned in the Midrash Rabbah). Gershom Scholem writes that these "were considered to represent the sublimest levels of intuitive cognition, and to be within the grasp of only a few chosen individuals". The Chayyah and the Yechidah do not enter into the body like the other three—thus they received less attention in other sections of the Zohar.
 Chayyah (חיה): The part of the soul that allows one to have an awareness of the divine life force itself.
 Yehidah (יחידה): The highest plane of the soul, in which one can achieve as full a union with God as is possible.

Both rabbinic and kabbalistic works posit that there are a few additional, non-permanent states of the soul that people can develop on certain occasions. These extra souls, or extra states of the soul, play no part in any afterlife scheme, but are mentioned for completeness:
 Ruach HaKodesh (רוח הקודש) ("spirit of holiness"): a state of the soul that makes prophecy possible. Since the age of classical prophecy passed, no one (outside of Israel) receives the soul of prophecy any longer.
 Neshamah Yeseira: The "supplemental soul" that a Jew can experience on Shabbat. It makes possible an enhanced spiritual enjoyment of the day. This exists only when one is observing Shabbat; it can be lost and gained depending on one's observance.
 Neshamah Kedosha: Provided to Jews at the age of maturity (13 for boys, 12 for girls) and is related to the study and fulfillment of the Torah commandments. It exists only when one studies and follows the Torah; it can be lost and gained depending on one's study and observance.

Reincarnation 

Reincarnation, the transmigration of the soul after death, was introduced into Judaism as a central esoteric tenet of Kabbalah from the Medieval period onwards, called Gilgul neshamot ("cycles of the soul"). The concept does not appear overtly in the Hebrew Bible or classic rabbinic literature, and was rejected by various Medieval Jewish philosophers. However, the Kabbalists explained a number of scriptural passages in reference to Gilgulim. The concept became central to the later Kabbalah of Isaac Luria, who systemised it as the personal parallel to the cosmic process of rectification. Through Lurianic Kabbalah and Hasidic Judaism, reincarnation entered popular Jewish culture as a literary motif.

Tzimtzum, Shevirah and Tikkun 

Tzimtzum (Constriction/Concentration) is the primordial cosmic act whereby God "contracted" His infinite light, leaving a "void" into which the light of existence was poured. This allowed the emergence of independent existence that would not become nullified by the pristine Infinite Light, reconciling the unity of the Ein Sof with the plurality of creation. This changed the first creative act into one of withdrawal/exile, the antithesis of the ultimate Divine Will. In contrast, a new emanation after the Tzimtzum shone into the vacuum to begin creation, but led to an initial instability called Tohu (Chaos), leading to a new crisis of Shevirah (Shattering) of the sephirot vessels. The shards of the broken vessels fell down into the lower realms, animated by remnants of their divine light, causing primordial exile within the Divine Persona before the creation of man. Exile and enclothement of higher divinity within lower realms throughout existence requires man to complete the Tikkun olam (Rectification) process. Rectification Above corresponds to the reorganization of the independent sephirot into relating Partzufim (Divine Personas), previously referred to obliquely in the Zohar. From the catastrophe stems the possibility of self-aware Creation, and also the Kelipot (Impure Shells) of previous Medieval kabbalah. The metaphorical anthropomorphism of the partzufim accentuates the sexual unifications of the redemption process, while Gilgul reincarnation emerges from the scheme. Uniquely, Lurianism gave formerly private mysticism the urgency of Messianic social involvement.

According to interpretations of Luria, the catastrophe stemmed from the "unwillingness" of the residue imprint after the Tzimtzum to relate to the new vitality that began creation. The process was arranged to shed and harmonise the Divine Infinity with the latent potential of evil. The creation of Adam would have redeemed existence, but his sin caused new shevirah of Divine vitality, requiring the Giving of the Torah to begin Messianic rectification. Historical and individual history becomes the narrative of reclaiming exiled Divine sparks.

Linguistic mysticism and the mystical Torah 
Kabbalistic thought extended Biblical and Midrashic notions that God enacted Creation through the Hebrew language and through the Torah into a full linguistic mysticism. In this, every Hebrew letter, word, number, even accent on words of the Hebrew Bible contain Jewish mystical meanings, describing the spiritual dimensions within exoteric ideas, and it teaches the hermeneutic methods of interpretation for ascertaining these meanings. Names of God in Judaism have further prominence, though infinite meaning turns the whole Torah into a Divine name. As the Hebrew name of things is the channel of their lifeforce, parallel to the sephirot, so concepts such as "holiness" and "mitzvot" embody ontological Divine immanence, as God can be known in manifestation as well as transcendence. The infinite potential of meaning in the Torah, as in the Ein Sof, is reflected in the symbol of the two trees of the Garden of Eden; the Torah of the Tree of Knowledge is the external, finite Halachic Torah, enclothed within which the mystics perceive the unlimited infinite plurality of meanings of the Torah of the Tree of Life. In Lurianic terms, each of the 600,000 root souls of Israel find their own interpretation in Torah, as "God, the Torah and Israel are all One".

As early as the 1st century BCE Jews believed that the Torah and other canonical texts contained encoded messages and hidden meanings. Gematria is one method for discovering its hidden meanings. In this system, each Hebrew letter also represents a number. By converting letters to numbers, Kabbalists were able to find a hidden meaning in each word. This method of interpretation was used extensively by various schools.

In contemporary interpretation of kabbalah, Sanford Drob makes cognitive sense of this linguistic mythos by relating it to postmodern philosophical concepts described by Jacques Derrida and others, where all reality embodies narrative texts with infinite plurality of meanings brought by the reader. In this dialogue, kabbalah survives the nihilism of Deconstruction by incorporating its own Lurianic Shevirah, and by the dialectical paradox where man and God imply each other.

Cognition, mysticism, or values

Kabbalists as mystics 
The founder of the academic study of Jewish mysticism, Gershom Scholem, privileged an intellectual view of the nature of Kabbalistic symbols as dialectic Theosophical speculation. In contrast, contemporary scholarship of Moshe Idel and Elliot R. Wolfson has opened a phenomenological understanding of the mystical nature of Kabbalistic experience, based on a close reading of the historical texts. Wolfson has shown that among the closed elite circles of mystical activity, medieval Theosophical Kabbalists held that an intellectual view of their symbols was secondary to the experiential. In the context of medieval Jewish philosophical debates on the role of imagination in Biblical prophecy, and essentialist versus instrumental kabbalistic debates about the relation of sephirot to God, they saw contemplation on the sephirot as a vehicle for prophecy. Judaism's ban on physical iconography, along with anthropomorphic metaphors for Divinity in the Hebrew Bible and midrash, enabled their internal visualisation of the Divine sephirot Anthropos in imagination. Disclosure of the aniconic in iconic internal psychology, involved sublimatory revelation of Kabbalah's sexual unifications. Previous academic distinction between Theosophical versus Abulafian Ecstatic-Prophetic Kabbalah overstated their division of aims, which revolved around visual versus verbal/auditory views of prophecy. In addition, throughout the history of Judaic Kabbalah, the greatest mystics claimed to receive new teachings from Elijah the Prophet, the souls of earlier sages (a purpose of Lurianic meditation prostrated on the graves of Talmudic Tannaim, Amoraim and Kabbalists), the soul of the mishnah, ascents during sleep, heavenly messengers, etc. A tradition of parapsychology abilities, psychic knowledge, and theurgic intercessions in heaven for the community is recounted in the hagiographic works Praises of the Ari, Praises of the Besht, and in many other Kabbalistic and Hasidic tales. Kabbalistic and Hasidic texts are concerned to apply themselves from exegesis and theory to spiritual practice, including prophetic drawing of new mystical revelations in Torah. The mythological symbols Kabbalah uses to answer philosophical questions, themselves invite mystical contemplation, intuitive apprehension and psychological engagement.

Paradoxical coincidence of opposites 
In bringing Theosophical Kabbalah into contemporary intellectual understanding, using the tools of modern and postmodern philosophy and psychology, Sanford Drob shows philosophically how every symbol of the Kabbalah embodies the simultaneous dialectical paradox of mystical Coincidentia oppositorum, the conjoining of two opposite dualities. Thus the Infinite Ein Sof is above the duality of Yesh/Ayin Being/Non-Being transcending Existence/Nothingness (Becoming into Existence through the souls of Man who are the inner dimension of all spiritual and physical worlds, yet simultaneously the Infinite Divine generative lifesource beyond Creation that continuously keeps everything spiritual and physical in existence); Sephirot bridge the philosophical problem of the One and the Many; Man is both Divine (Adam Kadmon) and human (invited to project human psychology onto Divinity to understand it); Tzimtzum is both illusion and real from Divine and human perspectives; evil and good imply each other (Kelipah draws from Divinity, good arises only from overcoming evil); Existence is simultaneously partial (Tzimtzum), broken (Shevirah), and whole (Tikun) from different perspectives; God experiences Himself as Other through Man, Man embodies and completes (Tikun) the Divine Persona Above. In Kabbalah's reciprocal Panentheism, Theism and Atheism/Humanism represent two incomplete poles of a mutual dialectic that imply and include each other's partial validity. This was expressed by the Chabad Hasidic thinker Aaron of Staroselye, that the truth of any concept is revealed only in its opposite.

Metaphysics or axiology 
By expressing itself using symbols and myth that transcend single interpretations, Theosophical Kabbalah incorporates aspects of philosophy, Jewish theology, psychology and unconscious depth psychology, mysticism and meditation, Jewish exegesis, theurgy, and ethics, as well as overlapping with theory from magical elements. Its symbols can be read as questions which are their own existentialist answers (the Hebrew sephirah Chokhmah-Wisdom, the beginning of Existence, is read etymologically by Kabbalists as the question "Koach Mah?" the "Power of What?"). Alternative listings of the Sephirot start with either Keter (Unconscious Will/Volition), or Chokhmah (Wisdom), a philosophical duality between a Rational or Supra-Rational Creation, between whether the Mitzvot Judaic observances have reasons or transcend reasons in Divine Will, between whether study or good deeds is superior, and whether the symbols of Kabbalah should be read as primarily metaphysical intellectual cognition or Axiology values. Messianic redemption requires both ethical Tikkun olam and contemplative Kavanah. Sanford Drob sees every attempt to limit Kabbalah to one fixed dogmatic interpretation as necessarily bringing its own Deconstruction (Lurianic Kabbalah incorporates its own Shevirah self shattering; the Ein Sof transcends all of its infinite expressions; the infinite mystical Torah of the Tree of Life has no/infinite interpretations). The infinite axiology of the Ein Sof One, expressed through the Plural Many, overcomes the dangers of nihilism, or the antinomian mystical breaking of Jewish observance alluded to throughout Kabbalistic and Hasidic mysticisms.

Primary texts 

Like the rest of the rabbinic literature, the texts of kabbalah were once part of an ongoing oral tradition, though, over the centuries, much of the oral tradition has been written down.

Jewish forms of esotericism existed over 2,000 years ago. Ben Sira (born c. 170 BCE) warns against it, saying: "You shall have no business with secret things". Nonetheless, mystical studies were undertaken and resulted in mystical literature, the first being the Apocalyptic literature of the second and first pre-Christian centuries and which contained elements that carried over to later kabbalah.

Throughout the centuries since, many texts have been produced, among them the ancient descriptions of Sefer Yetzirah, the Heichalot mystical ascent literature, the Bahir, Sefer Raziel HaMalakh and the Zohar, the main text of Kabbalistic exegesis. Classic mystical Bible commentaries are included in fuller versions of the Mikraot Gedolot (Main Commentators). Cordoveran systemisation is presented in Pardes Rimonim, philosophical articulation in the works of the Maharal, and Lurianic rectification in Etz Chayim. Subsequent interpretation of Lurianic Kabbalah was made in the writings of Shalom Sharabi, in Nefesh HaChaim and the 20th-century Sulam. Hasidism interpreted kabbalistic structures to their correspondence in inward perception. The Hasidic development of kabbalah incorporates a successive stage of Jewish mysticism from historical kabbalistic metaphysics.

Scholarship 

The first modern-academic historians of Judaism, the "Wissenschaft des Judentums" school of the 19th century, framed Judaism in solely rational terms in the emancipatory Haskalah spirit of their age. They opposed kabbalah and restricted its significance from Jewish historiography. In the mid-20th century, it was left to Gershom Scholem to overturn their stance, establishing the flourishing present-day academic investigation of Jewish mysticism, and making Heichalot, Kabbalistic and Hasidic texts the objects of scholarly critical-historical study. In Scholem's opinion, the mythical and mystical components of Judaism were at least as important as the rational ones, and he thought that they, rather than the exoteric Halakha or intellectualist Jewish philosophy, were the living subterranean stream in historical Jewish development that periodically broke out to renew the Jewish spirit and social life of the community. Scholem's magisterial Major Trends in Jewish Mysticism (1941) among his seminal works, though representing scholarship and interpretations that have subsequently been challenged and revised within the field, remains the only academic survey studying all main historical periods of Jewish mysticism

The Hebrew University of Jerusalem has been a centre of this research, including Scholem and Isaiah Tishby, and more recently Joseph Dan, Yehuda Liebes, Rachel Elior, and Moshe Idel. Scholars across the eras of Jewish mysticism in America and Britain have included Alexander Altmann, Arthur Green, Lawrence Fine, Elliot Wolfson, Daniel Matt, Louis Jacobs and Ada Rapoport-Albert.

Moshe Idel has opened up research on the Ecstatic Kabbalah alongside the theosophical, and has called for new multi-disciplinary approaches, beyond the philological and historical that have dominated until now, to include phenomenology, psychology, anthropology and comparative studies.

Claims for authority 
Historians have noted that most claims for the authority of kabbalah involve an argument of the antiquity of authority (see, e.g., Joseph Dan's discussion in his Circle of the Unique Cherub). As a result, virtually all early foundational works pseudepigraphically claim, or are ascribed, ancient authorship. For example, Sefer Raziel HaMalach, an astro-magical text partly based on a magical manual of late antiquity, Sefer ha-Razim, was, according to the kabbalists, transmitted by the angel Raziel to Adam after he was evicted from Eden. Another famous work, the early Sefer Yetzirah, is dated back to the patriarch Abraham. This tendency toward pseudepigraphy has its roots in apocalyptic literature, which claims that esoteric knowledge such as magic, divination and astrology was transmitted to humans in the mythic past by the two angels, Aza and Azaz'el (in other places, Azaz'el and Uzaz'el) who fell from heaven (see Genesis 6:4).

As well as ascribing ancient origins to texts, and reception of Oral Torah transmission, the greatest and most innovative Kabbalists claimed mystical reception of direct personal divine revelations, by heavenly mentors such as Elijah the Prophet, the souls of Talmudic sages, prophetic revelation, soul ascents on high, etc. On this basis Arthur Green speculates, that while the Zohar was written by a circle of Kabbalists in medieval Spain, they may have believed they were channeling the souls and direct revelations from the earlier mystic circle of Shimon bar Yochai in 2nd century Galilee depicted in the Zohar's narrative. Academics have compared the Zohar mystic circle of Spain with the romanticised wandering mystic circle of Galilee described in the text. Similarly, Isaac Luria gathered his disciples at the traditional Idra assembly location, placing each in the seat of their former reincarnations as students of Shimon bar Yochai.

Criticism

Dualistic cosmology 

Although Kabbalah propounds the Unity of God, one of the most serious and sustained criticisms is that it may lead away from monotheism, and instead promote dualism, the belief that there is a supernatural counterpart to God. The dualistic system holds that there is a good power versus an evil power. There are two primary models of Gnostic-dualistic cosmology: the first, which goes back to Zoroastrianism, believes creation is ontologically divided between good and evil forces; the second, found largely in Greco-Roman metaphysics like Neo-Platonism, argues that the universe knew a primordial harmony, but that a cosmic disruption yielded a second, evil dimension to reality. This second model influenced the cosmology of the Kabbalah.

According to Kabbalistic cosmology, the Ten Sephirot correspond to ten levels of creation. These levels of creation must not be understood as ten different "gods" but as ten different ways of revealing God, one per level. It is not God who changes but the ability to perceive God that changes.

While God may seem to exhibit dual natures (masculine-feminine, compassionate-judgmental, creator-creation), all adherents of Kabbalah have consistently stressed the ultimate unity of God. For example, in all discussions of Male and Female, the hidden nature of God exists above it all without limit, being called the Infinite or the "No End" (Ein Sof)—neither one nor the other, transcending any definition. The ability of God to become hidden from perception is called "Restriction" (Tzimtzum). Hiddenness makes creation possible because God can become "revealed" in a diversity of limited ways, which then form the building blocks of creation.

Kabbalistic texts, including the Zohar, appear to affirm dualism, as they ascribe all evil to the separation from holiness known as the Sitra Achra ("the other side") which is opposed to Sitra D'Kedushah, or the Side of Holiness. The "left side" of divine emanation is a negative mirror image of the "side of holiness" with which it was locked in combat. [Encyclopaedia Judaica, Volume 6, "Dualism", p. 244]. While this evil aspect exists within the divine structure of the Sephirot, the Zohar indicates that the Sitra Ahra has no power over Ein Sof, and only exists as a necessary aspect of the creation of God to give man free choice, and that evil is the consequence of this choice. It is not a supernatural force opposed to God, but a reflection of the inner moral combat within mankind between the dictates of morality and the surrender to one's basic instincts.

David Gottlieb notes that many Kabbalists hold that the concepts of, e.g., a Heavenly Court or the Sitra Ahra are only given to humanity by God as a working model to understand His ways within our own epistemological limits. They reject the notion that a satan or angels actually exist. Others hold that non-divine spiritual entities were indeed created by God as a means for exacting his will.

According to Kabbalists, humans cannot yet understand the infinity of God. Rather, there is God as revealed to humans (corresponding to Zeir Anpin), and the rest of the infinity of God as remaining hidden from human experience (corresponding to Arich Anpin). One reading of this theology is monotheistic, similar to panentheism; another reading of the same theology is that it is dualistic. Gershom Scholem writes:

Distinction between Jews and non-Jews 
According to Isaac Luria (1534–72) and other commentators on the Zohar, righteous Gentiles do not have this demonic aspect and are in many ways similar to Jewish souls. A number of prominent Kabbalists, e.g., Pinchas Eliyahu of Vilna, the author of Sefer ha-Brit, held that only some marginal elements in the humanity represent these demonic forces. On the other hand, the souls of Jewish heretics have much more satanic energy than the worst of idol worshippers; this view is popular in some Hasidic circles, especially Satmar Hasidim.

On the other hand, many prominent Kabbalists rejected this idea and believed in essential equality of all human souls. Menahem Azariah da Fano (1548–1620), in his book Reincarnations of souls, provides many examples of non-Jewish Biblical figures being reincarnated into Jews and vice versa.

But one point of view is represented by the Hasidic work Tanya (1797), in order to argue that Jews have a different character of soul: while a non-Jew, according to the author Shneur Zalman of Liadi (born 1745), can achieve a high level of spirituality, similar to an angel, his soul is still fundamentally different in character, from a Jewish one. A similar view is found in Kuzari, an early medieval philosophical book by Yehuda Halevi (1075–1141 AD).

Another prominent Habad rabbi, Abraham Yehudah Khein (born 1878), believed that spiritually elevated Gentiles have essentially Jewish souls, "who just lack the formal conversion to Judaism", and that unspiritual Jews are "Jewish merely by their birth documents". The great 20th-century Kabbalist Yehuda Ashlag viewed the terms "Jews" and "Gentile" as different levels of perception, available to every human soul.

David Halperin argues that the collapse of Kabbalah's influence among Western European Jews over the course of the 17th and 18th century was a result of the cognitive dissonance they experienced between the negative perception of Gentiles found in some exponents of Kabbalah, and their own positive dealings with non-Jews, which were rapidly expanding and improving during this period due to the influence of the Enlightenment.

However, a number of renowned Kabbalists claimed the exact opposite, stressing universality of all human souls and providing universal interpretations of the Kabbalistic tradition, including its Lurianic version. In their view, Kabbalah transcends the borders of Judaism and can serve as a basis of inter-religious theosophy and a universal religion. Pinchas Elijah Hurwitz, a prominent Lithuanian-Galician Kabbalist of the 18th century and a moderate proponent of the Haskalah, called for brotherly love and solidarity between all nations, and believed that Kabbalah can empower everyone, Jews and Gentiles alike, with prophetic abilities.

The works of Abraham Cohen de Herrera (1570–1635) are full of references to Gentile mystical philosophers. Such approach was particularly common among the Renaissance and post-Renaissance Italian Jews. Late medieval and Renaissance Italian Kabbalists, such as Yohanan Alemanno, David Messer Leon and Abraham Yagel, adhered to humanistic ideals and incorporated teachings of various Christian and pagan mystics.

A prime representative of this humanist stream in Kabbalah was Elijah Benamozegh, who explicitly praised Christianity, Islam, Zoroastrianism, Hinduism, as well as a whole range of ancient pagan mystical systems. He believed that Kabbalah can reconcile the differences between the world religions, which represent different facets and stages of the universal human spirituality. In his writings, Benamozegh interprets the New Testament, Hadith, Vedas, Avesta and pagan mysteries according to the Kabbalistic theosophy.

E. R. Wolfson provides numerous examples from the 17th to the 20th centuries, which would challenge the view of Halperin as well as the notion that "modern Judaism" has rejected or dismissed this "outdated aspect" of the religion and, he argues, there are still Kabbalists today who harbor this view. He argues that, while it is accurate to say that many Jews do and would find this distinction offensive, it is inaccurate to say that the idea has been totally rejected in all circles. As Wolfson has argued, it is an ethical demand on the part of scholars to continue to be vigilant with regard to this matter and in this way the tradition can be refined from within.

Medieval views 

The idea that there are ten divine sephirot could evolve over time into the idea that "God is One being, yet in that One being there are Ten" which opens up a debate about what the "correct beliefs" in God should be, according to Judaism. The early Kabbalists debated the relationship of the Sephirot to God, adopting a range of essentialist versus instrumental views. Modern Kabbalah, based on the 16th century systemisations of Cordovero and Isaac Luria, takes an intermediate position: the instrumental vessels of the sephirot are created, but their inner light is from the undifferentiated Ohr Ein Sof essence.

The pre-Kabbalistic Saadia Gaon teaches in his book Emunot v'Deot that Jews who believe in reincarnation have adopted a non-Jewish belief.

Maimonides (12th century), celebrated by followers for his Jewish rationalism, rejected many of the pre-Kabbalistic Hekalot texts, particularly Shi'ur Qomah whose starkly anthropomorphic vision of God he considered heretical. Maimonides, a centrally important medieval sage of Judaism, lived at the time of the first emergence of Kabbalah. Modern scholarship views the systemisation and publication of their historic oral doctrine by Kabbalists, as a move to rebut the threat on Judaic observance by the populance misreading Maimonides' ideal of philosophical contemplation over ritual performance in his philosophical Guide of the Perplexed. They objected to Maimonides equating the Talmudic Maaseh Breishit and Maaseh Merkavah secrets of the Torah with Aristotelean physics and metaphysics in that work and in his legal Mishneh Torah, teaching that their own Theosophy, centred on an esoteric metaphysics of traditional Jewish practice, is the Torah's true inner meaning.

The Kabbalist medieval rabbinic sage Nachmanides (13th century), classic debater against Maimonidean rationalism, provides background to many kabbalistic ideas. An entire book entitled Gevuras Aryeh was authored by Yaakov Yehuda Aryeh Leib Frenkel and originally published in 1915, specifically to explain and elaborate on the kabbalistic concepts addressed by Nachmanides in his classic commentary to the Five books of Moses.

Abraham ben Moses ben Maimon, in the spirit of his father Maimonides, Saadiah Gaon, and other predecessors, explains at length in his Milḥamot HaShem that God is in no way literally within time or space nor physically outside time or space, since time and space simply do not apply to his being whatsoever, emphasising the Monotheist Oneness of Divine transcendence unlike any worldly conception. Kabbalah's Panentheism expressed by Moses Cordovero and Hasidic thought, agrees that God's essence transcends all expression, but holds in contrast that existence is a manifestation of God's Being, descending immanently through spiritual and physical condensations of the divine light. By incorporating the pluralist many within God, God's Oneness is deepened to exclude the true existence of anything but God. In Hasidic Panentheism, the world is acosmic from the Divine view, yet real from its own perspective.

Around the 1230s, Rabbi Meir ben Simon of Narbonne wrote an epistle (included in his Milḥemet Mitzvah) against his contemporaries, the early Kabbalists, characterizing them as blasphemers who even approach heresy. He particularly singled out the Sefer Bahir, rejecting the attribution of its authorship to the tanna R. Neḥunya ben ha-Kanah and describing some of its content as truly heretical.

Leone di Modena, a 17th-century Venetian critic of Kabbalah, wrote that if we were to accept the Kabbalah, then the Christian trinity would be compatible with Judaism, as the Trinity seems to resemble the kabbalistic doctrine of the sephirot. This was in response to the belief that some European Jews of the period addressed individual sephirot in their prayers, although the practice was apparently uncommon. Apologists explained that Jews may have been praying for and not necessarily to the aspects of Godliness represented by the sephirot. In contrast to Christianity, Kabbalists declare that one prays only "to Him (God's Essence, male solely by metaphor in Hebrew's gendered grammar), not to his attributes (sephirot or any other Divine manifestations or forms of incarnation)". Kabbalists directed their prayers to God's essence through the channels of particular sephirot using kavanot Divine names intentions. To pray to a manifestation of God introduces false division among the sephirot, disrupting their absolute unity, dependence and dissolving into the transcendent Ein Sof; the sephirot descend throughout Creation, only appearing from man's perception of God, where God manifests by any variety of numbers.

Yaakov Emden (1697–1776), himself an Orthodox Kabbalist who venerated the Zohar, concerned to battle Sabbatean misuse of Kabbalah, wrote the Mitpaḥath Sfarim (Veil of the Books), an astute critique of the Zohar in which he concludes that certain parts of the Zohar contain heretical teaching and therefore could not have been written by Shimon bar Yochai. He also expressed the extremely unconventional view, contrary to all evidence, that the pious Maimonides could not have written the Guide of the Perplexed, which must have been the work of an unknown heretic.

Emden's Kabbalist contemporary the Vilna Gaon (1720–1797) early modern Rabbinic sage, held the Zohar and Luria in deep reverence, critically emending classic Judaic texts from historically accumulated errors by his acute acumen and scholarly belief in the perfect unity of Kabbalah revelation and Rabbinic Judaism. Though a Lurianic Kabbalist, his commentaries sometimes chose Zoharic interpretation over Luria when he felt the matter lent itself to a more exoteric view. Although proficient in mathematics and sciences and recommending their necessity for understanding Talmud, he had no use for canonical medieval Jewish philosophy, declaring that Maimonides had been "misled by the accursed philosophy" in denying belief in the external occult matters of demons, incantations and amulets.

Views of Kabbalists regarding Jewish philosophy varied from those who appreciated Maimonidean and other classic medieval philosophical works, integrating them with Kabbalah and seeing profound human philosophical and Divine kabbalistic wisdoms as compatible, to those who polemicised against religious philosophy during times when it became overly rationalist and dogmatic. A dictum commonly cited by Kabbalists, "Kabbalah begins where Philosophy ends", can be read as either appreciation or polemic. Moses of Burgos (late 13th century) declared, "these philosophers whose wisdom you are praising end where we begin". Moses Cordovero appreciated the influence of Maimonides in his quasi-rational systemisation. From its inception, the Theosophical Kabbalah became permeated by terminology adapted from philosophy and given new mystical meanings, such as its early integration with the Neoplatonism of Ibn Gabirol and use of Aristotelian terms of Form over Matter.

Orthodox Judaism 

Pinchas Giller and Adin Steinsaltz write that Kabbalah is best described as the inner part of traditional Jewish religion, the official metaphysics of Judaism, that was essential to normative Judaism until fairly recently. With the decline of Jewish life in medieval Spain, it displaced rationalist Jewish philosophy until the modern rise of Haskalah enlightenment, receiving a revival in our postmodern age. While Judaism always maintained a minority tradition of religious rationalist criticism of Kabbalah, Gershom Scholem writes that Lurianic Kabbalah was the last theology that was near predominant in Jewish life. While Lurianism represented the elite of esoteric Kabbalism, its mythic-messianic divine drama and personalisation of reincarnation captured the popular imagination in Jewish folklore and in the Sabbatean and Hasidic social movements. Giller notes that the former Zoharic-Cordoverian classic Kabbalah represented a common exoteric popular view of Kabbalah, as depicted in early modern Musar literature.

In contemporary Orthodox Judaism there is dispute as to the status of the Zohar's and Isaac Luria's (the Arizal) Kabbalistic teachings. While a portion of Modern Orthodox, followers of the Dor De'ah movement, and many students of the Rambam reject Arizal's Kabbalistic teachings, as well as deny that the Zohar is authoritative or from Shimon bar Yohai, all three of these groups accept the existence and validity of the Talmudic Maaseh Breishit and Maaseh Merkavah mysticism. Their disagreement concerns whether the Kabbalistic teachings promulgated today are accurate representations of those esoteric teachings to which the Talmud refers. The mainstream Haredi (Hasidic, Lithuanian, Oriental) and Religious Zionist Jewish movements revere Luria and the Kabbalah, but one can find both rabbis who sympathize with such a view, while disagreeing with it, as well as rabbis who consider such a view heresy. The Haredi Eliyahu Dessler and Gedaliah Nadel maintained that it is acceptable to believe that the Zohar was not written by Shimon bar Yochai and that it had a late authorship. Yechiel Yaakov Weinberg mentioned the possibility of Christian influence in the Kabbalah with the "Kabbalistic vision of the Messiah as the redeemer of all mankind" being "the Jewish counterpart to Christ."

Modern Orthodox Judaism, representing an inclination to rationalism, embrace of academic scholarship, and the individual's autonomy to define Judaism, embodies a diversity of views regarding Kabbalah from a Neo-Hasidic spirituality to Maimonist anti-Kabbalism. In a book to help define central theological issues in Modern Orthodoxy, Michael J. Harris writes that the relationship between Modern Orthodoxy and mysticism has been under-discussed. He sees a deficiency of spirituality in Modern Orthodoxy, as well as the dangers in a fundamentalist adoption of Kabbalah. He suggests the development of neo-Kabbalistic adaptions of Jewish mysticism compatible with rationalism, offering a variety of precedent models from past thinkers ranging from the mystical inclusivism of Abraham Isaac Kook to a compartmentalisation between Halakha and mysticism.

Yiḥyeh Qafeḥ, a 20th-century Yemenite Jewish leader and Chief Rabbi of Yemen, spearheaded the Dor De'ah ("generation of knowledge") movement to counteract the influence of the Zohar and modern Kabbalah. He authored critiques of mysticism in general and Lurianic Kabbalah in particular; his magnum opus was Milḥamoth ha-Shem (Wars of Hashem) against what he perceived as neo-platonic and gnostic influences on Judaism with the publication and distribution of the Zohar since the 13th Century. Rabbi Yiḥyah founded yeshivot, rabbinical schools, and synagogues that featured a rationalist approach to Judaism based on the Talmud and works of Saadia Gaon and Maimonides (Rambam).

Yeshayahu Leibowitz (1903–1994), an ultra-rationalist Modern Orthodox philosopher and brother of Nechama Leibowitz, publicly shared views expressed in Yiḥyeh Qafeḥ's book Milḥamoth HaShem against mysticism. For example, Leibowitz called Kabbalah "a collection of "pagan superstitions" and "idol worship" in remarks given after receiving the Yakir Yerushalayim Award (English: worthy citizen of Jerusalem) in 1990. In modern times, rationalists holding similar views as those of the Dor De'ah movement have described themselves as "talmide ha-Rambam" (disciples of Maimonides) rather than as being aligned with Dor De'ah, and are more theologically aligned with the rationalism of Modern Orthodox Judaism than with Orthodox Ḥasidic or Ḥaredi communities.

Conservative, Reform and Reconstructionist Judaism 

Kabbalah tended to be rejected by most Jews in the Conservative and Reform movements, though its influences were not completely eliminated. While it was generally not studied as a discipline, the Kabbalistic Kabbalat Shabbat service remained part of liberal liturgy, as did the Yedid Nefesh prayer. Nevertheless, in the 1960s, Saul Lieberman of the Jewish Theological Seminary of America is reputed to have introduced a lecture by Scholem on Kabbalah with a statement that Kabbalah itself was "nonsense", but the academic study of Kabbalah was "scholarship". This view became popular among many Jews, who viewed the subject as worthy of study, but who did not accept Kabbalah as teaching literal truths.

According to Bradley Shavit Artson (Dean of the Conservative Ziegler School of Rabbinic Studies in the American Jewish University) 

However, in the late 20th century and early 21st century there has been a revival in interest in Kabbalah in all branches of liberal Judaism. The Kabbalistic 12th-century prayer Anim Zemirot was restored to the new Conservative Sim Shalom siddur, as was the B'rikh Shmeh passage from the Zohar, and the mystical Ushpizin service welcoming to the Sukkah the spirits of Jewish forbearers. Anim Zemirot and the 16th-century mystical poem Lekhah Dodi reappeared in the Reform Siddur Gates of Prayer in 1975. All rabbinical seminaries now teach several courses in Kabbalah—in Conservative Judaism, both the Jewish Theological Seminary of America and the Ziegler School of Rabbinic Studies of the American Jewish University in Los Angeles have full-time instructors in Kabbalah and Hasidut, Eitan Fishbane and Pinchas Giller, respectively. In Reform Judaism, Sharon Koren teaches at the Hebrew Union College-Jewish Institute of Religion. Reform rabbis like Herbert Weiner and Lawrence Kushner have renewed interest in Kabbalah among Reform Jews. At the Reconstructionist Rabbinical College, the only accredited seminary that has curricular requirements in Kabbalah, Joel Hecker is the full-time instructor teaching courses in Kabbalah and Hasidut.

According to Artson: 

The Reconstructionist movement, under the leadership of Arthur Green in the 1980s and 1990s, and with the influence of Zalman Schachter Shalomi, brought a strong openness to Kabbalah and hasidic elements that then came to play prominent roles in the Kol ha-Neshamah siddur series.

Contemporary study 
Teaching of classic esoteric kabbalah texts and practice remained traditional until recent times, passed on in Judaism from master to disciple, or studied by leading rabbinic scholars. This changed in the 20th century, through conscious reform and the secular openness of knowledge. In contemporary times kabbalah is studied in four very different, though sometimes overlapping, ways:
 The traditional method, employed among Jews since the 16th century, continues in learned study circles. Its prerequisite is to either be born Jewish or be a convert and to join a group of kabbalists under the tutelage of a rabbi, since the 18th century more likely a Hasidic one, though others exist among Sephardi-Mizrachi, and Lithuanian rabbinic scholars. Beyond elite, historical esoteric kabbalah, the public-communally studied texts of Hasidic thought explain kabbalistic concepts for wide spiritual application, through their own concern with popular psychological perception of Divine Panentheism.
 A second, new universalist form, is the method of modern-style Jewish organisations and writers, who seek to disseminate kabbalah to every man, woman and child regardless of race or class, especially since the Western interest in mysticism from the 1960s. These derive from various cross-denominational Jewish interests in kabbalah, and range from considered theology to popularised forms that often adopt New Age terminology and beliefs for wider communication. These groups highlight or interpret kabbalah through non-particularist, universalist aspects.
 A third way are non-Jewish organisations, mystery schools, initiation bodies, fraternities and secret societies, the most popular of which are Freemasonry, Rosicrucianism and the Golden Dawn, although hundreds of similar societies claim a kabbalistic lineage. These derive from syncretic combinations of Jewish kabbalah with Christian, occultist or contemporary New Age spirituality. As a separate spiritual tradition in Western esotericism since the Renaissance, with different aims from its Jewish origin, the non-Jewish traditions differ significantly and do not give an accurate representation of the Jewish spiritual understanding (or vice versa).
 Fourthly, since the mid-20th century, historical-critical scholarly investigation of all eras of Jewish mysticism has flourished into an established department of university Jewish studies. Where the first academic historians of Judaism in the 19th century opposed and marginalised kabbalah, Gershom Scholem and his successors repositioned the historiography of Jewish mysticism as a central, vital component of Judaic renewal through history. Cross-disciplinary academic revisions of Scholem's and others' theories are regularly published for wide readership.

Universalist Jewish organisations
The two, unrelated organisations that translate the mid-20th-century teachings of Yehuda Ashlag into a contemporary universalist message, have given kabbalah a public cross-religious profile:
 Bnei Baruch is a group of Kabbalah students, based in Israel. Study materials are available in over 25 languages for free online or at printing cost. Michael Laitman established Bnei Baruch in 1991, following the passing of his teacher, Ashlag's son Rav Baruch Ashlag. Laitman named his group Bnei Baruch (sons of Baruch) to commemorate the memory of his mentor. The teaching strongly suggests restricting one's studies to 'authentic sources', kabbalists of the direct lineage of master to disciple.
 The Kabbalah Centre was founded in the United States in 1965 as The National Research Institute of Kabbalah by Philip Berg and Rav Yehuda Tzvi Brandwein, disciple of Yehuda Ashlag's. Later Philip Berg and his wife re-established the organisation as the worldwide Kabbalah Centre. In recent times its outreach teaching in New Age style has been "derided by critics as Hollywood's new "non-religion" and even "the McDonald's of spirituality"" after having attracted a cross-religious celebrity following (see Madonna) and media profile, though the organisation is led by Orthodox Jewish teachers.

Other prominent Jewish universalist organisations:
 The Kabbalah Society, run by Warren Kenton, an organisation based instead on pre-Lurianic Medieval Kabbalah presented in universalist style. In contrast, traditional kabbalists read earlier kabbalah through later Lurianism and the systemisations of 16th-century Safed.
 The New Kabbalah, website and books by Sanford L. Drob, is a scholarly intellectual investigation of the Lurianic symbolism in the perspective of modern and postmodern intellectual thought. It seeks a "new kabbalah" rooted in the historical tradition through its academic study, but universalised through dialogue with modern philosophy and psychology. This approach seeks to enrich the secular disciplines, while uncovering intellectual insights formerly implicit in kabbalah's essential myth:

 The Kabbalah of Information is described in the 2018 book From Infinity to Man: The Fundamental Ideas of Kabbalah Within the Framework of Information Theory and Quantum Physics written by Ukrainian-born professor and businessman Eduard Shyfrin. The main tenet of the teaching is "In the beginning He created information", rephrasing the famous saying of Nahmanides, "In the beginning He created primordial matter and He didn't create anything else, just shaped it and formed it."

Hasidic 
Since the 18th century, Jewish mystical development has continued in Hasidic Judaism, turning kabbalah into a social revival with texts that internalise mystical thought. Among different schools, Chabad-Lubavitch and Breslav with related organisations, give outward looking spiritual resources and textual learning for secular Jews. The Intellectual Hasidism of Chabad most emphasises the spread and understanding of kabbalah through its explanation in Hasidic thought, articulating the Divine meaning within kabbalah through human rational analogies, uniting the spiritual and material, esoteric and exoteric in their Divine source:

Neo-Hasidic 
From the early 20th century, Neo-Hasidism expressed a modernist or non-Orthodox Jewish interest in Jewish mysticism, becoming influential among Modern Orthodox, Conservative, Reform and Reconstructionalist Jewish denominations from the 1960s, and organised through the Jewish Renewal and Chavurah movements. The writings and teachings of Zalman Schachter-Shalomi, Arthur Green, Lawrence Kushner, Herbert Weiner and others, has sought a critically selective, non-fundamentalist neo- Kabbalistic and Hasidic study and mystical spirituality among modernist Jews. The contemporary proliferation of scholarship by Jewish mysticism academia has contributed to critical adaptions of Jewish mysticism. Arthur Green's translations from the religious writings of Hillel Zeitlin conceive the latter to be a precursor of contemporary Neo-Hasidism. Reform rabbi Herbert Weiner's Nine and a Half Mystics: The Kabbala Today (1969), a travelogue among Kabbalists and Hasidim, brought perceptive insights into Jewish mysticism to many Reform Jews. Leading Reform philosopher Eugene Borowitz described the Orthodox Hasidic Adin Steinsaltz (The Thirteen Petalled Rose) and Aryeh Kaplan as major presenters of Kabbalistic spirituality for modernists today.

Rav Kook 
The writings of Abraham Isaac Kook (1864–1935), first chief rabbi of Mandate Palestine and visionary, incorporate kabbalistic themes through his own poetic language and concern with human and divine unity. His influence is in the Religious Zionist community, who follow his aim that the legal and imaginative aspects of Judaism should interfuse:

Mandaean parallels 

Nathaniel Deutsch writes:

R.J. Zwi Werblowsky suggests Mandaeism has more commonality with Kabbalah than with Merkabah mysticism such as cosmogony and sexual imagery. The Thousand and Twelve Questions, Scroll of Exalted Kingship, and Alma Rišaia Rba link the alphabet with the creation of the world, a concept found in Sefer Yetzirah and the Bahir.
Mandaean names for uthras (angels or guardians) have been found in Jewish magical texts. Abatur appears to be inscribed inside a Jewish magic bowl in a corrupted form as "Abiṭur". Ptahil is found in Sefer HaRazim listed among other angels who stand on the ninth step of the second firmament.

See also 

 Aggadah
 Ayin and Yesh
 Gnosticism
 Jewish astrology
 Ka-Bala board game
 List of Jewish Kabbalists
 Mandaeism
 Notarikon
 Temurah (Kabbalah)
 The Four Who Entered Paradise

Citations

General references 
 Bodoff, Lippman; "Jewish Mysticism: Medieval Roots, Contemporary Dangers and Prospective Challenges"; The Edah Journal 2003 3.1
 Dan, Joseph; The Early Jewish Mysticism, Tel Aviv: MOD Books, 1993.
 Dan, Joseph; The Heart and the Fountain: An Anthology of Jewish Mystical Experiences, New York: Oxford University Press, 2002.
 Dan, Joseph; "Samael, Lilith, and the Concept of Evil in Early Kabbalah", AJS Review, vol. 5, 1980.
 Dan, Joseph; The 'Unique Cherub' Circle, Tübingen: J.C.B. Mohr, 1999.
 Dan, J. and Kiener, R.; The Early Kabbalah, Mahwah, N.J.: Paulist Press, 1986.
 Dennis, G.; The Encyclopedia of Jewish Myth, Magic, and Mysticism, St. Paul: Llewellyn Worldwide, 2007.
 Fine, Lawrence, ed. Essential Papers in Kabbalah, New York: NYU Press, 1995.
 Fine, Lawrence; Physician of the Soul, Healer of the Cosmos: Isaac Luria and his Kabbalistic Fellowship, Stanford: Stanford University Press, 2003.
 Fine, Lawrence; Safed Spirituality, Mahwah, N.J.: Paulist Press, 1989.
 Fine, Lawrence, ed., Judaism in Practice, Princeton N.J.: Princeton University Press, 2001.
 Green, Arthur; EHYEH: A Kabbalah for Tomorrow. Woodstock: Jewish Lights Publishing, 2003.
 Grözinger, Karl E., Jüdisches Denken Band 2: Von der mittelalterlichen Kabbala zum Hasidismus, (Campus) Frankfurt /New York, 2005
 Hecker, Joel; Mystical Bodies, Mystical Meals: Eating and Embodiment in Medieval Kabbalah. Detroit: Wayne State University Press, 2005.
 Levy, Patrick, HaKabbalist, edi. Yael, Tel Aviv 2010.Author's website.
 Idel, Moshe; Kabbalah: New Perspectives. New Haven and London: Yale University Press, 1988.
 Idel, Moshe; The Golem: Jewish Magical and Mystical Traditions on the Artificial Anthropoid, New York: SUNY Press, 1990.
 Idel, Moshe; Hasidism: Between Ecstasy and Magic, New York: SUNY Press, 1995.
 Idel, Moshe; Kabbalistic Prayer and Color, Approaches to Judaism in Medieval Times, D. Blumenthal, ed., Chicago: Scholar's Press, 1985.
 Idel, Moshe; The Mystica Experience in Abraham Abulafia, New York, SUNY Press, 1988.
 Idel, Moshe; Kabbalah: New Perspectives, New Haven, Yale University Press, 1988.
 Idel, Moshe; Magic and Kabbalah in the 'Book of the Responding Entity; The Solomon Goldman Lectures VI, Chicago: Spertus College of Judaica Press, 1993.
 Idel, Moshe; "The Story of Rabbi Joseph della Reina"; Behayahu, M. Studies and Texts on the History of the Jewish Community in Safed.
 Kaplan, Aryeh; Inner Space: Introduction to Kabbalah, Meditation and Prophecy. Moznaim Publishing Corp 1990.
 McGiney, John W.; The Written' as the Vocation of Conceiving Jewishly
 Samuel, Gabriella; "The Kabbalah Handbook: A Concise Encyclopedia of Terms and Concepts in Jewish Mysticism". Penguin Books 2007.
 Scholem, Gershom; Major Trends in Jewish Mysticism, 1941.
 Scholem, Gershom; Jewish Gnosticism, Merkabah Mysticism, and the Talmudic Tradition, 1960.
 Scholem, Gershom; Sabbatai Zevi, the Mystical Messiah, 1973.
 Scholem, Gershom; Kabbalah, Jewish Publication Society, 1974.
 Wineberg, Yosef; Lessons in Tanya: The Tanya of R. Shneur Zalman of Liadi (5 volume set). Merkos L'Inyonei Chinuch, 1998.
 Wirszubski, Chaim; Pico della Mirandola's Encounter with Jewish Mysticism, Harvard University Press, 1989.
 Wolfson, Elliot; Through a Speculum That Shines: Vision and Imagination in Medieval Jewish Mysticism, Princeton: Princeton University Press, 1994.
 Wolfson, Elliot; Language, Eros Being: Kabbalistic Hermeneutics and Poetic Imagination, New York: Fordham University Press, 2005.
 Wolfson, Elliot; Venturing Beyond: Law and Morality in Kabbalistic Mysticism, Oxford: Oxford University Press, 2006.
 Wolfson, Elliot; Alef, Mem, Tau: Kabbalistic Musings on Time, Truth, and Death, Berkeley: University of California Press, 2006.
 Wolfson, Elliot; Luminal Darkness: Imaginal Gleanings From Zoharic Literature, London: Onworld Publications, 2007.
 The Wisdom of The Zohar: An Anthology of Texts, three volume set, Ed. Isaiah Tishby, translated from the Hebrew by David Goldstein, The Littman Library.

External links 

 Jewish Encyclopedia: Cabala
 Hermetic Kabbalah
 Judaism 101: Kabbalah and Jewish Mysticism
 King David Kabbalah on Mount Zion, Jerusalem
 The Kabbalah Centre
 Learn Kabbalah: Lurianic Kabbalah
 Chabad.org's "What is Kabbalah?"
 Devekut.com A compendium of Neo-Hasidic thought

 
Esoteric schools of thought
Jewish culture
Jewish mysticism
Jewish theology
Language and mysticism
Panentheism